15 éxitos, vol. 2 is a greatest hits album by Mexican singer Flor Silvestre, released in 1989 by Musart Records. It includes fifteen of Flor Silvestre's hits from the late 1950s to the late 1960s. Originally released as an LP record, it has been reissued several times on compact cassette, CD, and digital download.

1989 LP track listing
Side one

Side two

References

External links
 15 éxitos, vol. 2 at AllMusic

1989 greatest hits albums
1998 greatest hits albums
Flor Silvestre albums
Spanish-language albums
Musart Records albums